The Frog Princess is a novel authored by E. D. Baker. First published in 2002, the story is a spoof on the  German fairy tale, The Frog Prince. The 2009 Disney animated musical feature film, The Princess and the Frog, is loosely based on this novel.

Plot summary
Emeralda, a.k.a. Emma is the princess and heir of Greater Greensward. One of her most distinct traits is her unique laugh, which sounds like a donkey's bray. The only person that appreciates her is her aunt Grassina, the current Green Witch.

When her mother, Queen Chartreuse, says she has to marry the stuck-up Prince Jorge from East Aradia, her worst enemy, she runs off to the swamp where she meets Prince Eadric of Upper Montevista. The only problem is that he has been turned into a frog by the witch Mudine. Emma reluctantly kisses him, trying to reverse the spell; instead, she turns into a frog herself.

Annoyed and confused by this outcome, Emma and Eadric set off to find the witch that turned him into a frog and ask her to change them back. A dog persistently chases them throughout the journey.

Upon reaching the site where Eadric insulted (and was cursed by) the witch that transformed him, they find an ugly woman searching there. The two assume she's the witch Mudine, but she turns out to be Vannabe, a vain witch wannabe who has taken Mudine's house, pets, and possessions and plans to use the frogs for a potion she thinks will make her eternally beautiful. With the aid of Mudine's former pets, the two frogs escape and free all the prisoners.

The animals confirm that Mudine has disappeared, so Emma suggests they go to Grassina for help. L'il the bat and Fang the snake accompany them as protection during the journey, though Fang leaves after reuniting with his lover Clarise. At the castle Grassina confirms their true identity and explains why they're both stuck as frogs: while Emma kissed Eadric, she had been wearing the curse-reversal bracelet Grassina had given her in case an evil witch had attacked Emma. And to transform back Emma and Eadric will have to kiss again while wearing the bracelet. Emma recalls that it was stolen by an otter, so the three head to the swamp to retrieve it.

Grassina is unable to progress further into the swamp due to a hereditary curse placed on Green Witches involving flowers (which until now she had passed off as an allergy) and Eadric is chased again by the pursuing dog, so Emma has to confront the otter alone. She passes herself off as a powerful fairy and performs some magic to convince the otter to turn over the bracelet, and narrowly manages to kiss Eadric before the dog catches up to them both.

The two transform back into humans, and the dog transforms as well. It turns out to be Eadric's horse that he had been riding on when he met Mudine, who had also cursed his steed. Returning to Grassina, she finds her aunt with the otter, who is actually Grassina's old beau Haywood, cursed by Grassina's witch mother. The two couples make plans to convince their respective parents that they've found their own true loves.

Characters
Principal Characters
Emeralda "Emma" The princess and heir of Greater Greensward.

Eadric – A prince turned frog, and the heir of Upper Montevista.
Grassina – The younger sister of Greater Greensward's queen, as well as the Green Witch. She is very close to her niece Emma.
Chartreuse – The queen of Greater Greensward, and Emma's mother. She has always had a rocky relationship with her daughter.
L'il Stinker, a.k.a. L'il – A bat who was held hostage at a witch's cabin. After Emma freed her, she decided to stay with Emma.
Fang – A snake who was also held hostage at a witch's cabin. When Emma freed him, he offers to escort them back to the castle.

Reception and reviews
Diane Roback was mixed in her review for Publishers Weekly saying that "the tale occasionally offers peppy dialogue and some comical scenes--particularly as the newly transformed Emeralda adjusts to catching flies ("My eye-tongue coordination wasn't very good," she admits). Unfortunately, the plot doesn't make much of the magical elements (for example, the characters' encounters with a dragon and a nymph seem inconsequential), resulting in a disappointingly flat fantasy."

Todd Morning was positive in his review for Booklist saying "the ending in this fairy tale–twisting first novel is rather like a Shakespearean comedy, with lots of disguises revealed. Unlike some takeoffs that revolve around one joke, this manages to be entertaining throughout, helped along by Emeralda’s amusing first person narration and the many witty lines."

Nancy Menaldi-Scanlon in her review for School Library Journal thought that the vocabulary did not match the book's intended audience saying "The tale moves at a good pace, and, though the happy ending is predictable, the trials and tribulations that precede it are interesting. However, it's difficult to determine the book's audience. While the story would appeal to primary to intermediate grade girls, the vocabulary is rather sophisticated and seems to be more suited to young adults."

Sequels
E.D. Baker followed The Frog Princess with more books in the series chronicling Emma and Eadric's adventures: Dragon's Breath (2005), Once Upon a Curse (2006), and No Place for Magic (2008), as well as a prequel, The Salamander Spell (2008).

There is also an epilogue series of the books about Emma and Eadrics' daughter, Millie. The titles for that series are The Dragon Princess, Dragon Kiss and the most recent, A Prince Among Frogs.

See also

"The Frog Prince"
The Princess and the Frog

Footnotes

2002 American novels
2002 children's books
2002 debut novels
American children's novels
American fantasy novels adapted into films
Children's fantasy novels
Debut fantasy novels
Books about frogs
Fiction about shapeshifting
Witchcraft in written fiction
Bloomsbury Publishing books